Peet Bijen (born 28 January 1995) is a Dutch former professional footballer who played as a centre-back. He played for FC Twente, ADO Den Haag and Emmen.

Club career
On 30 August 2021, he signed a one-season contract with Emmen. In August 2022, Bijen announced his retirement from playing due to ankle injury.

Career statistics

Honours

Club
FC Twente
Eerste Divisie: 2018–19

References

External links
 
 Netherlands profile at Ons Oranje
 

1995 births
Living people
Sportspeople from Hengelo
Dutch footballers
Netherlands youth international footballers
Netherlands under-21 international footballers
Association football central defenders
FC Twente players
ADO Den Haag players
FC Emmen players
Eredivisie players
Eerste Divisie players
Footballers from Overijssel
Jong FC Twente players